Live with the Possum is a live album by American country music singer George Jones released on November 9, 1999, on the Asylum Records label.  It was Jones's second and final album with Asylum Records and his second ever live album. Recorded in Knoxville on May 21, 1993, at the Knoxville Civic Center in Knoxville, Tennessee, it was the soundtrack of a previously released video of Jones in concert called Live in Tennessee.  Alan Jackson introduced the set with a short tribute.  Ron Gaddis, Jones' bass player and band leader, provided vocals on "No Show Jones," the concert opener that George originally recorded with Merle Haggard in 1982.  In 2006 Jones commented to Billboard, "As long as the people still want to come, I'm gonna be there. I don't care if I'm 95. I'm at the point in life where I really could shut it off, but what would I do?"

Track listing

Personnel
Bobby Birkhead - drums
James Buchanan - fiddle
Ron Gaddis - bass guitar, backing vocals
Kent Goodson - keyboards, harmonica
George Jones - lead vocals, acoustic guitar
Tom Killen - pedal steel guitar
Jerry Reid - acoustic and electric guitars, backing vocals

Chart performance

External links
 George Jones' Official Website
 Record Label

1999 live albums
George Jones live albums